Yevhen Valentinovich Lapinsky (23 March 1942 – 29 September 1999), also known as Yevgeny Lapinsky, was a Ukrainian former volleyball player who competed for the Soviet Union in the 1968 Summer Olympics and in the 1972 Summer Olympics. He played for Burevestnik Odessa.

He was Jewish, and was born in the Krasnoye Zagorye, Voronezh, Russian SFSR.

In 1968, he was part of the Soviet team which won the gold medal in the Olympic tournament. He played all nine matches.

Four years later, in 1972, he won the bronze medal with the Soviet team in the 1972 Olympic tournament. He played four matches.

See also
List of select Jewish volleyball players

References

External links
 
 
 

1942 births
1999 deaths
Russian men's volleyball players
Ukrainian men's volleyball players
Soviet men's volleyball players
Olympic volleyball players of the Soviet Union
Volleyball players at the 1968 Summer Olympics
Volleyball players at the 1972 Summer Olympics
Olympic gold medalists for the Soviet Union
Olympic bronze medalists for the Soviet Union
Olympic medalists in volleyball
Jewish volleyball players
Soviet Jews
Jewish Ukrainian sportspeople
Sportspeople from Odesa
People from Voronezh Oblast
Medalists at the 1972 Summer Olympics
Medalists at the 1968 Summer Olympics
Burevestnik (sports society) athletes
K. D. Ushinsky South Ukrainian National Pedagogical University alumni